Louis Tebogo Moholo (born 10 March 1940), is a South African jazz drummer. He has been a member of several notable bands, including The Blue Notes, the Brotherhood of Breath and Assagai.

Biography
Born in Cape Town, Moholo formed The Blue Notes with Chris McGregor, Johnny Dyani, Nikele Moyake, Mongezi Feza and Dudu Pukwana,<ref>John Corbett, "South African drummer Louis Moholo-Moholo fans the spark of resistance into the flame of liberated jazz", Chicago Reader, 29 August 2017.</ref> and emigrated to Europe with them in 1964, eventually settling in London, where he formed part of a South African exile community that made an important contribution to British jazz. In 1966, he toured Buenos Aires, Argentina, where he performed at the Theatron with Steve Lacy, Johnny Dyani and Enrico Rava and recorded the album The Forest and the Zoo with the same musicians. He was a member of the Brotherhood of Breath, a big band comprising several South African exiles and leading musicians of the British free jazz scene in the 1970s and is the founder of Viva la Black and The Dedication Orchestra. His first album under his own name, Spirits Rejoice on Ogun Records, is considered a classic example of the combination of British and South African players. In the early 1970s, Moholo was also a member of the afro-rock band Assagai.

He has played with many musicians, including Derek Bailey, Steve Lacy, Evan Parker, Enrico Rava, Roswell Rudd, Irène Schweizer, Cecil Taylor, John Tchicai, Archie Shepp, Peter Brötzmann, Mike Osborne, Keith Tippett, Elton Dean and Harry Miller.

Moholo returned to South Africa in September 2005, performing with George E. Lewis at the UNYAZI Festival of Electronic Music in Johannesburg. He now goes under the name Louis Moholo-Moholo because the name is more ethnically authentic. South African promoter Slow Life in March 2017 at the Olympia Bakery in Kalk Bay, Cape Town produced a show where Louis performed along with Mark Fransman, Reza Khota, Keenan Ahrends and Brydon Bolton.

Discography
As a Leader
 Louis Moholo; Spirits Rejoice!; Ogun: OG520 (1978)
 Louis Moholo with Larry Stabbins, Keith Tippett; Tern (Live); FMP-SAJ-43/44 (1983)
 Louis Moholo's Viva La Black; Ogun: OG533 (1988)
 Louis Moholo's Viva La Black; Exile; Ogun: OGCD003 (1991)
 Louis Moholo's Viva La Black; Freedom Tour - Live in South Africa 1993; Ogun: OGCD006 (1994)
 Louis Moholo Moholo meets Mervyn Africa, Pule Pheto, Keith Tippett; Mpumi; Ogun: OGCD014 (2002)
 Louis Moholo-Moholo with Stan Tracey; Khumbula (Remember); Ogun: OGCD016 (2005)
 Louis Moholo-Moholo Septet; Bra Louis - Bra Tebs + Louis Moholo-Moholo Octet; Spirits Rejoice!; Ogun: OGCD017/018 (2006)
 Louis Moholo-Moholo's Viva La Black; Live at Ruvo; Ogun: OGCD 020 (2004)
 Louis Moholo-Moholo Duets with Marilyn Crispell; Sibanye (We Are One) (Live); Intakt Records: Intact CD 145 (2008)
 Louis Moholo-Moholo Unit; An Open Letter to My Wife Mpumi; Ogun: OGCD031 (2009)
 Louis Moholo-Moholo, Dudu Pukwana, Johnny Dyani with Rev. Frank Wright; Spiritual Knowledge and Grace (Live); Ogun: OGCD035 (2011)
 Louis Moholo-Moholo Quartet; 4 Blokes; Ogun: OGCD043 (2014)
 Louis Moholo-Moholo Unit; For the Blue Notes (Live); Ogun: OGCD042 (2014)
 Louis Moholo-Moholo with Frode Gjerstad; Sult (Live); FMR: FMRCD069 (2014)
 Louis Moholo-Moholo with Frode Gjerstad, Nick Stephens, Fred Lonberg-Holm; Distant Groove; FRM Records: FMRCD385-0115 (2015)
 Louis Moholo-Moholo's Five Blokes; Uplift the People (Live); Ogun: OGCD047 (2018)
 Louis Moholo-Moholo's Five Blokes; Live @ the Vortex Jazz Club; Vortex (2020)

Collaborations
 Irène Schweizer, Rüdiger Carl, Louis Moholo; Messer; FMP: FMP 0290 (1976)
 Irène Schweizer, Rüdiger Carl, Louis Moholo; Tuned Boots; FMP: FMP 0550 (1978)
 Peter Brötzmann, Harry Miller, Louis Moholo; The Nearer the Bone, the Sweeter the Meat; FMP: FMP 0690 (1979)
 Keith Tippett & Louis Moholo; No Gossip; FMP: SAJ-28 (1980)
 Peter Brötzmann, Harry Miller, Louis Moholo; Opened, But Hardly Touched; FMP: FMP0840/50 (1981)
 Irène Schweizer & Louis Moholo (Live); Intakt: 006/1987 (1988)
 Cecil Taylor & Louis Moholo-Moholo; Remembrance; FMP: FMP CD 004 (1989)
 Vincent Chancey, Φλώρος Φλωρίδης (Floros Floridis), Peter Kowald, Louis Moholo; Human Aspect;  OM: B/002 (1990)
 Derek Bailey, Thebe Lipere & Louis Moholo; Village Life (Live); Incus: CD09 (1992)
 John Law & Louis Moholo; The Boat is Sinking, Aparteid is Sinking; Impetus: IMP CD 19322
 Louis Moholo / Evan Parker / Pule Pheto / Gibo Pheto / Barry Guy Quintet; Bush Fire; Ogun: OGCD009 (1996)
 Evan Parker, Steve Beresford, John Edwards, Louis Moholo; Foxes Fox; Emanem 4035 (1999)
 Hasse Poulsen, Peter Friis Lielsen, Louis Moholo; Copenhagen; AV-ART: AACD 1010 (2000)
 Roger Smith & Louis Moholo-Moholo; The Butterfly and the Bee; Emanem 4114 (2005)
 Foxes Fox (Evan Parker, Steve Beresford, John Edwards, Louis Moholo); Naan Tso; Psi: psi 05.07 (2005)
 Frode Gjerstad, Nick Stephens & Louis Moholo-Moholo; Quiddity (2007); Loose Torque: LT 019 (2009)
 Wadada Leo Smith & Louis Moholo-Moholo; Ancestors; TUM: TUM CD 029 (2012)
 Alexander Hawkins & Louis Moholo-Moholo; Keep Your Heart Straight; Ogun: OGCD 039 (2012)
 Livio Minafra & Louis Moholo-Moholo; Born Free (Live); (2015)
 Canto Generàl featuring Louis Moholo-Moholo; Rebel Flames; Ogun: OGCD 044 (2015)

with Chris McGregor
 Chris McGregor Group; Very Urgent; Polydor (1968)
 Chris McGregor Septet; Up to Earth (1969); Fledg'ling: FLED 3069 (2008)
 Chris McGregor Trio; Our Prayer (1969); Fledg'ling: FLED 3070 (2008)

with The Brotherhood of Breath
 Chris McGregor's Brotherhood of Breath; Neon (1970)
 Brotherhood; RCA (1972)
 Bremen to Bridgwater (1971/1975); Cuneiform Rune, (2004)
 Live at Willisau; Ogun: OG 100 (1974)
 Procession; Ogun: OG 524 (1978)
 Yes Please; In and Out: IaO 1001 (1981)
 Country Cooking; Virgin/Venture (1988)
 En Concert a Banlieues Bleues with Archie Shepp; 52e Rue Est: RE CD 017 (1989)
 Travelling Somewhere (1973); Cuneiform Rune (2001)
 Eclipse at Dawn (1971); Cuneiform Rune (2008)

with Dudu Pukwana
 Dudu Phukwana and the "Spears"; Quality (1969)
 Dudu Pukwana & Spear; In The Townships; Caroline Records (1974)
 Dudu Pukwana & Spear; Flute Music; Caroline Records (1975)
 Black Horse (1975); Black Lion Vault Remastered (2012)
 Diamond Express; Arista Freedom: AF 1041 (1977)

with the Blue Notes
 Blue Notes For Mongezi; Ogun: OGD 001/002 (1976)
 Blue Notes in Concert - Volume 1; Ogun: OG 220 (1978)
 Blue Notes For Johnny; Ogun: OG 532 (1987)
 Legacy - Live in South Africa (1964); Ogun: OGCD 007 (1995)
 Township Bop (1964); Proper Records: PRP CD 013 (2002)
 Before the Wind Changes; Ogun: OGCD 037 (1976)

with Assagai
 Assagai; Vertigo (1971)
 Zimbabwe; Phillips (1971)

with Peter Brotzmann Group
 Alarm; FMP: FMP 1030 (1983)

with Curtis Clark Quintet
 Letter to South Africa; Nimbus West Records: NS501C (1986)
 Live At The Bimhuis; Nimbus West Records: NS505C (1988)

with The Dedication Orchestra
 Spirits Rejoice; Ogun: OGCD 101 (1992)
 Ixesha (Time); Ogun: OGCD 102/103 (1994)

with Harry Miller's Insispingo
 Family Affair; Ogun: OG 310 (1977)
 Which Way Now (1975); Cuneiform Records: Rune 233 (2006)
 Full Steam Ahead (1975–77); Reel Recordings: RR012 (2009)

with Circulasione Totale Orchestra
 Open Port (1998); Circulasione Totale: CT 09 (2008)
 Bandwidth; Rune Grammofon: RCD2089 (2009)
 PhilaOslo; Circulasione Totale: CT 12 (2011)
 Tampere-08; Circulasione Totale: CT 053 (2020)

As sideman
 Roswell Rudd; Roswell Rudd; America Records: 6114 (1971)
 Haaz & Company; Unlawful Noise; KGB Records: KGB 7076 (1976)
 Keith Tippett's Ark; Frames (Music for an Imaginary Film); Ogun: OGD 003/004 (1978)
 Triple Trip Touch with Frank Lowe & Louis Moholo; TTT Live! Konzert Basel / What About JAZZ Today!; Independent (1984)
 Dennis Gonzalez Dallas-London Sextet; Catechism; Daagnim Records 1 (1988)
 Cat O'Nine Tails; Hoki-Poki; Wire Cassettes: wire 001 (1990)
 Sean Bergin & Radio Freedom All Stars; Jazz for Freedom; VARAgram: VCD 006-02 (1990)
 Dennis Gonzalez Band of Sorcerers; Hymn for the Perfect Heart of a Pearl; Konnex Records: KCD 5026 (1991)
 Tristan Honsinger Quintett/ Sextett/ and with Mola Sylla; Travelogues - Music for Sasha Waltz & Guests; Independent (1995)
 Tristan Honsinger 5tet; Map of Moods; FMP: FMP CD 76 (1996)
 New York Art Quartet; Old Stuff; Cuneiform Rune 300 (2010)
 Keith Tippett Tapestry Orchestra; Live at Le Mans; redeye008 (2007)
 Elton Dean's Ninesense; Ninesense Suite; Jazzwerkstatt: jw107 (2011)
 John Corbett's Dangerous Musics; Kongens Gade; Leo Records: LR 617 (2011)
 Mike Osborne & Friends; Live at the Peanuts Club (1975); Jazz in Britain: JIB-07-S-DL (2020)

References

Other sources
Philippe Carles, André Clergeat, and Jean-Louis Comolli, Dictionnaire du Jazz, Paris, 1994.

External links
When free jazz means freedom by Gary May, originally published in French in 2005 in the magazine ImproJazz. This site also includes a 2010 interview with Moholo-Moholo by Olivier Ledure, also originally published in ImproJazz''.
FMP releases

1940 births
Living people
South African jazz drummers
South African jazz musicians
The Blue Notes members
20th-century South African musicians
21st-century South African musicians
Brotherhood of Breath members
The Dedication Orchestra members
Assagai members
FMP/Free Music Production artists
Incus Records artists
Intakt Records artists
Ogun Records Artists